Miss Ryley's soft-furred rat (Millardia kathleenae) is a species of rodent in the family Muridae.
It is found only in central Myanmar, and was also recorded on Mount Popa.

References

Rats of Asia
Millardia
Endemic fauna of Myanmar
Rodents of Southeast Asia
Mammals described in 1914
Taxa named by Oldfield Thomas
Taxonomy articles created by Polbot